(Franz) Bruno Salzer (13 May 1859 – 28 May 1919) was a German entrepreneur. Salzer was one of the leading entrepreneurs in Chemnitz around the start of the 20th century and the company he established was the biggest factory in Chemnitz before the Great Depression.

Life
Franz Bruno Salzer was born in Stollberg on 13 May 1859 as the son of stocking knitter Johann Gottlieb Salzer (1817–68) and grandson of Oberschlema innkeeper Ephraim Salzer. In 1880 he moved to Chemnitz, where at first he worked as a locksmith for Wirkmaschinenfabrik Hilscher. After his wedding in 1882 to Marie Anna Unger (1858–1925), he opened up a small workshop in 1883 together with fellow locksmith Carl August Schubert, who had previously worked for Maschinenfabrik Kappel. This workshop produced stocking knitter machines and expanded in 1885 after the success of a new model of Flachwirkwerklen for stockings (named System Paget). 1887 the two fellow entrepreneurs reformed their company into a stock corporation under the name "Chemnitzer Wirkwaren-Maschinenfabrik vormals Schubert & Salzer".

In 1892 Schubert left the ever-expanding company. After Salzer established himself as the sole technical engineer the company obtained the right to build automatic stocking machines (Rundstrickwerklen in System Standard) and developed the Petinet-Cottongrät, which not only revolutionised the stocking knitter technology in the Erzgebirge, but was exported to numerous manufacturers all over the world. After the First World War the company was the world's biggest seller of Flachstrickwerklen, while also experimenting with the production of bicycles and other machinery under the brand "Salzer & Co. GmbH" from 1896 to 1906.

Salzer committed suicide in Chemnitz on 28 May 1919.

Legacy and tributes
Bruno-Salzer-Straße (since 1997)

References

1859 births
1919 deaths
German chief executives
German company founders
People from Stollberg
Engineers from Chemnitz
Businesspeople from Saxony
1919 suicides
Suicides in Germany